Imre Polyák (16 April 1932 – 15 November 2010) was a featherweight Greco-Roman wrestler from Hungary. He competed in the 1952, 1956, 1960 and 1964 Olympics and won three silver and one gold medal. He won the world title in 1955, 1958 and 1962, and placed second in 1961 and 1963. Nationally Polyák won 12 Hungarian titles and was named Sportsman of the Year in 1958 and 1962.

Polyák was a policeman by profession. After retiring from competitions he worked as a coach in his native club Újpesti. In 2003 he was one of the first athletes to be inducted into the FILA International wrestling Hall of Fame.

See also
List of multiple Summer Olympic medalists

References

External links 

1932 births
2010 deaths
Olympic wrestlers of Hungary
Wrestlers at the 1952 Summer Olympics
Wrestlers at the 1956 Summer Olympics
Wrestlers at the 1960 Summer Olympics
Wrestlers at the 1964 Summer Olympics
Hungarian male sport wrestlers
Olympic gold medalists for Hungary
Olympic silver medalists for Hungary
Olympic medalists in wrestling
World Wrestling Championships medalists
Medalists at the 1964 Summer Olympics
Medalists at the 1960 Summer Olympics
Medalists at the 1956 Summer Olympics
Medalists at the 1952 Summer Olympics
People from Kecskemét
Sportspeople from Bács-Kiskun County